This is the discography of the Northern Irish blues, heavy metal and hard rock guitarist and singer-songwriter Gary Moore.

Albums

Solo studio albums

With other projects

Live albums

Compilation albums

Notes
X^ The Platinum Collection did not chart in UK and Sweden until February 2011.

Singles

Notes
'*^ "One Day" did not chart on the Finnish Singles Chart, but it did reach #23 on the Finnish Top 50 Hits Chart (50 Hittiä) which combined sales and airplay.

Granny's Intentions

Album
Honest Injun (Deram, 1970) (gt on 8 tracks, Johnny Hockedy on 3)

Skid Row

Albums
Skid (CBS, October 1970) #30 UK
34 Hours (CBS, 1971)
Skid Row (a.k.a. 'Dublin Gas Comy.') – CBS demos recorded early 1970 (CBS, 1990)
Skid Row (a.k.a. 'Gary Moore/Brush Shiels/Noel Bridgeman') – Gary Moore version of the unreleased third album recorded late 1971 (Castle, 1990)
Live And On Song – Both sides of Skid Row's first two singles on the Song label recorded 1969, plus a BBC 'In Concert' recording from 1971 (Hux, 2006)

Singles
"New Places, Old Faces" / "Misdemeanour Dream Felicity" (Song Records, 1969)
"Saturday Morning Man" / "Mervyn Aldridge" (Song Records, 1969)
"Sandie’s Gone (Part 1)" / "Sandie’s Gone (Part 2)" (CBS, April 1970)
"Night Of The Warm Witch" / "Mr. De-Luxe" (CBS, April 1971)
"Living One Day At A Time" / "Girl from Dublin City" (CBS, February 1972)

Thin Lizzy
Moore played in Thin Lizzy (1973–74, 1977–79) for several periods and worked with Phil Lynott subsequently in his solo career.

Albums
Nightlife (1974) (note that on the original album Moore only appears on the song "Still in Love with You", although the 2012 Deluxe includes both demo and BBC session tracks featuring Moore) 
Black Rose: A Rock Legend (1979)

Compilations
Remembering – Part 1 (1976)
The Continuing Saga of the Ageing Orphans (1979)
The Adventures of Thin Lizzy (1981)
Dedication: The Very Best of Thin Lizzy (1991)
The Boys Are Back in Town (1997)
Thin Lizzy Greatest Hits (2004)
At the BBC (2011)

Live
Life (1983)

Colosseum II
Colosseum II is a band that came from the ashes of Colosseum and featured Don Airey, Neil Murray/John Mole, Mike Starrs, Jon Hiseman and Moore.

Albums
Strange New Flesh (1976)
Electric Savage (1977)
War Dance (1977)
Variations (1978) w/ Andrew Lloyd Webber

Greg Lake
Moore participated in the recording of Greg Lake's two solo albums, Greg Lake (1981) and Manoeuvres (1983). He also played live in Greg Lake's line-up. Some notable performances of his touring stint with Lake, were the live covers of King Crimson songs "21st Century Schizoid Man", "In the Court of the Crimson King", as well as "Parisienne Walkways". One concert on this tour was recorded for the King Biscuit Flower Hour, and released on CD in 1995 as King Biscuit Flower Hour Presents Greg Lake in Concert.

Moore's 1983 album Dirty Fingers (which also featured ex-Ted Nugent vocalist Charlie Huhn, former Rainbow/Wild Horses and later Dio bassist Jimmy Bain, and ex-Black Oak Arkansas/Pat Travers and later Ozzy Osbourne/Whitesnake/Ted Nugent drummer Tommy Aldridge) had a song called "Nuclear Attack", which he also performed on the Greg Lake album.

Albums
Greg Lake (1981)
Manoeuvres (1983)
King Biscuit Flower Hour Presents Greg Lake in Concert (1995)

Early works, guest appearances & sessions 
 1970 Honest Injun - Granny's Intention (on "Maybe", "We Both Need To Know", "Good Eye", "Fifty Years On", "Susan of the Country", "Rise Then Fall", "With Salty Eyes", "Fourthskin Blues", and "Heavy Loaded Minds") 
 1970 DR. Strangely Strange - Heavy Petting (on "Summer Breeze", "Sign On My Mind", "Gave My Love An Apple", and "Mary Malone of Moscow")
 1973 Jonathan Kelly - Wait Till They Change The Backdrop (on "Turn Your Eye On Me", "Down On Me", "All In New Light", and "Hold On")
 1975 Eddie Howell - The Eddie Howell Gramophone Record (acoustic guitar on "Miss Amerika"; credited as Garry Moore) 
 1975 Various - The Rock Peter and the Wolf (acoustic guitar on "Introduction"; slide guitar on "Grandfather"; electric guitar on "Peter's Theme", "Duck Theme", "Duck and Bird", "Cat and Duck", "Peter's Chase", "Rock and Roll Celebration", "Duck Escape", and "Final Theme")
 1975 The Soul Searchers - "Scaramouche" b/w "Head Stand" 7" single 
 1978 Andrew Lloyd Webber - Variations
 1978 Gary Boyle - Electric Glide (on "Hayabusa" and "Gaz")
 1978 Rod Argent - Moving Home (acoustic guitar)
 1979 Cozy Powell - Over the Top (on "Killer")
 1980 Jack Lancaster - Skinningrove Bay (on "Kilten Castle"; credited as Garry Moore)
 1981 Cozy Powell - Tilt (on "Sunset" and "The Blister")
 1982 Johnny Duhan - Johnny Duhan (on "Ocean of Motion")
 1983 Royal Philharmonic Orchestra & Friends - Arrested (on "Truth Hits Everybody", "Arrested", "Message In A Bottle", and "Invisible Sun")
 1983 Chris Thompson - Out of the Night (on "Do What You Wanna Do")
 1985 The Beach Boys - The Beach Boys (on "Maybe I Don't Know" and "She Believes in Love Again")
 1986 Minako Honda - Cancel (on "Cancel")
 1986 Minako Honda - "The Cross (Ai No Jujika)" (non-album single; released by Gary as "Crying in the Shadows" on the CD version of Wild Frontier)
 1986 Frankie Goes to Hollywood - "Warriors of the Wasteland" (Attack Mix)
 1988 Don Airey - K2 (Tales Of Triumph And Tragedy) (on "Sea of Dreams Part 1" and "Song For Al")
 1988 Mo Foster - Bel Assis (on "The Light in Your Eyes" and "Pump II")
 1988 Keith Emerson - The Christmas Album (uncredited on "Captain Starship Christmas")
 1989 Vicki Brown - Lady of Time (on "Just For You" and "If I Thought")
 1990 Traveling Wilburys - Traveling Wilburys Vol. 3 (on "She's My Baby"; credited as Ken Wilbury)
 1990 Vicki Brown - About Love and Time (on "We Are One")
 1991 Mo Foster - Southern Reunion (on "Gil" and "A Notional Anthem")
 1992 Jimmy Nail - Growing Up in Public (on "Absent Friends")
 1993 Albert Collins - Collins Mix (The Best of) (on "If Trouble Was Money")
 1993 Paul Rodgers - Muddy Water Blues: A Tribute to Muddy Waters (on "She Moves Me")
 1994 Snowy White - Highway to the Sun (on "Keep On Working")
 1994 Jack Bruce - Cities of the Heart (on "Life On Earth", "N.S.U.", "Sitting on Top of the World", "Politician", and "Spoonful") 
 1997 Jack Bruce - Sitting On Top of The World (The 50th Birthday Concert)
 1997 Doctor Strangely Strange - Alternative Medicine: The Difficult Third Album (on "The Heat Came Down", "Whatever Happened To The Blues", and "Hard As Nails")
 2001 John Mayall & Friends - Along For The Ride (on "If I Don't Get Home")
 2001 Jim Capaldi - Living On The Outside (on "Heart of Stone")
 2001 Jack Bruce - Shadows in the Air (on "Heart Quake" and "Dark Heart")
 2002 Various - Various – From Clarksdale To Heaven - Remembering John Lee Hooker (on "I'm In The Mood" and "Serve Me Right to Suffer")
 2004 Trilok Gurtu - Broken Rhythms (on "Kabir")
 2004 Jim Capaldi - Poor Boy Blue
 2006 Otis Taylor - Definition of a Circle (on "Little Betty", "Something In Your Back Pocket", and "Love and Hesitation")
 2007 Various - Dear Mr Fantasy (Featuring the Music of Jim Capaldi & Traffic): A Celebration For Jim Capaldi (on "Evil Love" and "Love Will Keep Us Alive")

Videos
Thin Lizzy Live at Sydney Harbour '78 (1978)
Emerald Aisles. Live in Ireland (1984)
Live at Isstadion Stockholm: Wild Frontier Tour (1987)
The Video Singles (1987)
Live in Belfast: After the War Tour (1989)
An Evening of the Blues with Gary Moore and the Midnight Blues Band – featuring Albert Collins and Albert King (1990)
The Old Grey Whistle Test 2 (2003)
Live at Monsters of Rock (2003)
Gary Moore & The Midnight Blues Band – Live at Montreux 1990 (2004)
Gary Moore and B.B. King (2006)
Gary Moore and Friends: One Night in Dublin – A Tribute to Phil Lynott (2006)
Gary Moore - The Definitive Montreux Collection (2007)
Live at Montreux 2010 (2011)
Blues for Jimi (2012)
Gary Moore participated in a comedy skit entitled "The Easy Guitar Book Sketch", with comedian Rowland Rivron and fellow British musicians Mark Knopfler, Lemmy from Motorhead, Mark King from Level 42, and David Gilmour.

References

External links
 
 Conversation with Gary Moore, where he talks about his early days with Phil Lynott – "Moore's almanac." Belfast Telegraph, 24 May 2007.
 US Billboard 200 chart discography

Discographies of Irish artists
Rock music discographies
Blues discographies
Heavy metal discographies